Josiane is a feminine given name. It is a feminine name, of Tupinambá origin. Its meaning in the Tupinambá language is "He who was born under the waterfall". Or even the one with a very loud voice.

List of people with the given name 

 Josiane Balasko (born 1950), French actress, writer and director
 Josiane Corneloup (born 1959), French politician
 Josiane Shen, Luxembourgian television presenter
 Josiane Stoléru, French actress
 Josiane Tito (born 1979), Brazilian sprinter

See also 

 Josie (name)
 Josiah (given name)

Given names